M. Babu is an Indian Politician Member of Legislative Assembly of Tamil Nadu. He was elected from Cheyyur as an Viduthalai Chiruthaigal Katchi candidate in 2021.

Electoral performance

References 

Tamil Nadu MLAs 2021–2026
Living people
People from Kanchipuram district
Viduthalai Chiruthaigal Katchi politicians
Year of birth missing (living people)
Tamil Nadu politicians